Biswa Goswami (1921–1987) was an Indian politician. He was a Member of Parliament, representing Assam in the Rajya Sabha, the upper house of India's Parliament, as a member of the Janata Party.

References

Rajya Sabha members from Assam
Janata Party politicians
1921 births
1987 deaths